George McGill (1879–1963) was a U.S. Senator from Kansas from 1930 to 1939.

Senator McGill may also refer to:

Amanda McGill (born 1980), Nebraska State Senate
Andrew Ryan McGill (1840–1905), Minnesota State Senate
Paddy McGill (1913–1977), Northern Irish Senate
Yancey McGill (born 1952), South Carolina State Senate

See also
Charles Magill (Virginia judge) (1759–1827), Virginia State Senate